The Jiansanjiang–Heixiazi Island Expressway, commonly referred to as the Jianhei Expressway and designated G1012, is an expressway linking the town of Jiansanjiang with Hexiazi Island, entirely in the prefectural-level city of Jiamusi in the Chinese province of Heilongjiang. Prior to the national-level G designation, the highway was designated S14 by the province.

This section could be considered as part of G1012, but is not signed as such. 

In its eastern end, the expressway ends just before a bridge to Hexiazi Island, at a junction with County Road 109 in Fuyuan. The bridge will eventually connect a new trans-national road crossing over the Amur River to the Jewish Autonomous Oblast and nearby city of Khabarovsk, in Russia.

References

Chinese national-level expressways
Expressways in Heilongjiang